Interleukin-31 receptor A is a protein that in humans is encoded by the IL31RA gene.

IL31RA is related to gp130 (IL6ST; MIM 600694), the common receptor subunit for IL6 (MIM 147620)-type cytokines. Oncostatin M receptor (OSMR; MIM 601743) and IL31RA form the heterodimeric receptor through which IL31 (MIM 609509) signals. Expression of IL31RA and OSMR mRNA is induced in activated monocytes, and both mRNAs are constitutively expressed in epithelial cells (Dillon et al., 2004).[supplied by OMIM]

References

Further reading